The  is one of the most prestigious horse races in Japan. It is contested on the last Sunday of November, post time of 15:40 at Tokyo Racecourse in Fuchu, Tokyo at a distance of 2400 meters (about  miles) run under weight for age conditions with a maximum of 18 horses on turf (grass). With a purse of ¥476 million (about US$5.8 million), the Japan Cup is one of the richest races in the world.

The Japan Cup is an invitational event. During a relatively short history, the race has established itself as an international contest with winners from Japan, North America, Britain, Australia, New Zealand, Ireland, France, Germany and Italy.

The Japan Cup has produced some of the most memorable finishes seen in Japanese racing.  Along with the Prix de l'Arc de Triomphe, Melbourne Cup and the Breeders' Cup, the race ranks as one of the great end-of-year events.

The Japan Racing Association established the Japan Cup as an international invitational race in order for local racehorses to have the opportunity to compete against horses of an international calibre and to promote goodwill within the racing community worldwide.

Purse 
With the economic crisis of 2008, the Japanese yen went under 100 yen per dollar, which makes the Japan Cup the world's second richest turf horse race, after the Melbourne Cup (and third richest horse race of any kind, after the Dubai World Cup), passing the Prix de l'Arc de Triomphe, which in 2008 was the world's richest turf race.

(Purse value for 2015-onwards running)

Total JPN 624,000,000 (about US$5.2 million)
 1st  JPN ¥300,000,000 (about US$2.5 million)
 2nd  JPN ¥120,000,000 (about US$1 million)
 3rd  JPN ¥75,000,000 (about US$625,000)
 4th  JPN ¥45,000,000 (about US$375,000)
 5th  JPN ¥30,000,000 (about US$250,000)

Bonuses 
Bonuses include extra money added to the pot of the Japan Cup winner, particularly horses trained outside Japan.

In 2012 running:
If a foreign-based horse triumphs in one of the following races that year, and finished above third in Japan Cup, A bonus of 80, 32, or 20 million (in JPN ¥) will be added to prize money respectively, in accordance to their finishing position.
Canadian International Stakes
Cox Plate
Epsom Derby
Irish Derby
Prix du Jockey Club
Grand Prix de Paris
Grand Prix de Saint-Cloud
Dubai Sheema Classic
Dubai World Cup
International Stakes
Champion Stakes
Breeders' Cup Classic
If a foreign-based horse won one of the following races that year, they are granted early invitation to the race. The above bonus money will apply if they finished above third in Japan cup:
Breeders' Cup Turf
Grosser Preis von Baden
Arlington Million
Irish Champion Stakes
If a foreign-based horse finished above second the following races that year, they are granted an early invitation to the race. The above bonus money will apply if they are the winner of the respective races and finished above third in Japan Cup:
King George VI and Queen Elizabeth Stakes
Prix de l'Arc de Triomphe
If a horse belonged to JRA finished above third in both Japan Cup AND the following Arima Kinen, at most 50 million (in JPN ¥) prize pot will be given out.
If a horse finished first in that year's Tenno Sho (Autumn), Japan Cup and Arima Kinen. They will receive a Triple Crown bonus of JPN ¥200,000,000 for Japanese-bred horse, and JPN ¥100,000,000 for non-Japanese bred horse.

In the past, the Takarazuka Kinen, as well as the previous Japan cup were bonus criteria, but no longer nowadays. The same applies to the entry right to Arima Kinen for foreign-based winners (Currently they can directly enter the race).

Race history 

The inaugural running in 1981 was restricted to horses trained in Japan, the US, Australia, Canada, New Zealand and India, as well as ones that were specifically invited. An American mare triumphed as five-year-old Mairzy Doates, trained by John Fulton and partnered by Cash Asmussen, came home a length in front of the Canadian-trained Frost King, with The Very One, another from America, in third.

A year later restrictions on entry were abolished and the best horses from around the world were invited and the Japan Cup remains an invitational race.

There was again an American-trained victor in 1982, with three-year-old Half Iced getting the better of a thrilling battle with French fillies All Along and April Run by a couple of necks, with Stanerra a length back in fourth.

Stanerra, owned and trained by Irish retail millionaire Frank Dunne, returned to Japan in 1983, having enjoyed a brilliant season in Europe which included winning both the Hardwicke Stakes and the Prince of Wales's Stakes at Royal Ascot. The tough and courageous mare was partnered by regular jockey Brian Rouse in the third running of the Japan Cup and proved a head too strong for the Japanese-trained Kyoei Promise. It was a very close finish as Esprit Du Nord from France was another head back in third.

The race was officially ranked as International Grade 1 in 1984 (prior 1984 there is no Grading in all races in Japan). The race was highly anticipated as being the first showdown between two Triple Crowns in Japanese racing history. The Japanese did enjoyed a first home success, through neither two Triple Crown - Mr. C.B. and Symboli Rudolf - were winner, instead unfavoured four-year-old colt Katsuragi Ace, which defeated Bedtime, trained in Britain by Major Dick Hern, by a length and a half, took the title.

There was further Japanese success in 1985, with the previous year's third Symboli Rudolf defeating Rocky Tiger in good style.

Jupiter Island became the first British raider to capture the Japan Cup the following year of 1986 when the Clive Brittain-trained seven-year-old just got the better of compatriot Allez Milord, trained by Guy Harwood, by a head under an inspired ride from Pat Eddery.

The French made their mark in 1987 when the Robert Collet-trained and Alain Lequeux-ridden Le Glorieux came home in front, while the Americans struck for a third time in 1988 with the Robert J. Frankel-trained Pay The Butler, the mount of Chris McCarron.

In 1989 and 1990, horses from New Zealand and Australia came out on top. The 1989 renewal fell to the New Zealand six-year-old mare Horlicks when scoring by a neck in world record time for 2400 meters. A year later Better Loosen Up struck for Australian trainer David Hayes by a head from French-trained Ode, with another head to Cacoethes, trained by Guy Harwood, who had gone clear only to be caught close home. These two victories did much to promote Southern Hemisphere racing in the international arena.

Veteran American trainer Charlie Whittingham sent out Golden Pheasant to win in 1991. Owned by the Los Angeles Kings ice hockey team owner Bruce McNall and his superstar player, Wayne Gretzky, Golden Pheasant gave the USA a fourth Japan Cup victory, while the Japanese took the next three renewals with Tokai Teio (1992), Legacy World (1993) and Marvelous Crown (1994).

There had been a number of German challengers for the Japan Cup over the years but it was not until 1995 that a horse from that country proved successful, with five-year-old Lando triumphing under South African-born but British-based jockey Michael Roberts.

British trainer Michael Stoute landed both the 1996 and 1997 Japan Cups with the supremely tough and talented international campaigners Singspiel - by a nose - and Pilsudski - by a neck - respectively.

Singspiel, owned and bred by Sheikh Mohammed, won a total of five Group/Grade One events during his career, including the 1996 Canadian International Stakes and the 1997 Dubai World Cup.

Pilsudski's victory in 1997 came on his final appearance and was his sixth Group/Grade One victory. He took up stallion duties in Japan but moved to Ireland in 2004.

The Japanese then struck back with victories for El Condor Pasa (1998), Special Week (1999) and T M Opera O (2000).

El Condor Pasa led home a Japanese one, two, three in the 18th running - the first time this had happened.

The Sunday Silence colt Special Week, third in 1998, gave Japan's highest profile jockey Yutaka Take his first success in the Japan Cup which is watched by enthusiastic crowds of over 150,000. The Hong Kong-trained Indigenous ran a brilliant race to be second with 1998 Epsom Derby winner High-Rise, racing for Godolphin, in third and 1999 Prix de l'Arc de Triomphe winner Montjeu fourth.

T M Opera O went into the 2000 Japan Cup unbeaten that year and emerged with his record intact, scoring by a neck from Meisho Doto with Godolphin's fast-finishing Fantastic Light a nose back in third.

Jungle Pocket continued the Japanese run of success in 2001, with the winner of the Tokyo Yushun sweeping home under French jockey Olivier Peslier to beat T M Opera O by a neck. The Japanese also had the next three with Golan, from Sir Michael Stoute's Newmarket stable, in sixth.

In 2002 the Group One contest moved to Nakayama Racecourse while Tokyo Racecourse was being renovated. The distance was shortened to 2200 meters (about  miles) on the right-handed outer loop course.

Therein the Italian-trained challenger Falbrav, ridden by Frankie Dettori, was a nose too good for the American raider Sarafan in another thrilling finish, with Symboli Kris S a neck away in third. It was Dettori's second Japan Cup success as he had previously won on Singspiel in 1996. Falbrav subsequently transferred from Italy to Newmarket, England-based trainer Luca Cumani and went on to take five more Group One contests in 2003.

For the 2003 renewal, the great contest returned to Fuchu and was won by the Japanese-trained Tap Dance City, who triumphed on soft ground by an amazing nine lengths from That's The Plenty. Symboli Kris S was again third.

The prize stayed in Japan again in 2004. Zenno Rob Roy led home a Japanese 1-2-3 with French ace Olivier Peslier in the saddle. Zenno Rob Roy's Japan Cup success was the middle leg in a run of three Group One wins in Japan.

A photo finish decided the 2005 winner, as Alkaased narrowly beat Heart's Cry for the cup by a nose. This finish gave Heart's Cry his third near miss in a G-1 race. The previous year's winner Zenno Rob Roy placed third, beating Lincoln by a nose. Horlick's world record from 1989 was also broken, with an incredible time of 2m 22.1s.

Deep Impact won the 2006 running in the penultimate race of his career, helping the Sunday Silence colt to his second consecutive Horse of the Year award in Japan.

In the 2009 edition, another photo finish decided the winner, in which the five-year-old mare Vodka on her third Japan Cup try with the French jockey Christophe Lemaire won by a nose over the 2008 Kikuka Sho winner Oken Bruce Lee, at a time of 2 minutes and 22.4 seconds, the third-fastest Japan Cup ever run at the standard 2400-meter distance. Vodka's win would make her the 2nd-richest racehorse in Japan and the world; the two-time Breeders' Cup Turf winner Conduit would finish 4th on his final race of his career. Vodka placed 4th in the 2007 running to Admire Moon and 3rd in the 2008 running to Screen Hero, in which the latter ran 13th in the 2009 race.

The 2010 running ended in controversy when favourite Buena Vista was first past the post, only to be relegated to second behind Rose Kingdom as a result of light interference in the straight. The decision caused much debate around the world as to whether the interference was sufficient to warrant a change of placings. Although Buena Vista later won the Japan Cup in 2011.

The 2012 running was another Triple-Crown showdown between 2011 Triple Crown Orfevre and 2012 Fillies Triple Crown Gentildonna, 28 years since Mr. C.B. and Symboli Rudolf. It ended in another controversy again as Gentildonna, which was first past the post, bumped Orfevre off the line when they are battle on the straight line in a 1-2 finish. The following stewards inquiry decided Orfevre did being interfered by Gentildonna, but only her jockey Yasunari Iwata received a 2-day suspension, the result would still stand. Gentildonna became the first three year old filly to win the Japan Cup.

In the 2013 running of the race Gentildonna won again, rendering the filly to be not only the only horse to have won back to back victories in the race, but also the only horse to have won the Japan Cup twice.

The 2014 edition of the cup saw triumph of Epiphaneia a horse which went off at 15–1, with Just A Way coming in second to place and Spielberg coming in third to show.  Among the other horses the stallion bested was then five year old filly, Gentildonna, who was attempting to win the race for a third consecutive time.

In 2015, Shonan Pandora, yet another Japan Cup champion sired by the famed stallion and stud Deep Impact, became the seventh mare to take the trophy.

In the 2016 running of the race with a seventeen horse field, the Japanese stallion, Kitasan Black, ridden by Yutaka Take, was triumphant at the Cup with Sounds of Earth placing second and Grand Cheval coming in third.

In 2017, Cheval Grand which finished 3rd in the cup the year prior returned to win the race,
While Rey de Oro took second breaking late to beat out the favorite and defending champion Kitisan Black' who finished 3rd. Meanwhile, the win secured the number one spot in the year's Longines World's best jockey rankings for Grand Cheval's rider Hugh Bowman.

The 2018 running of the Japan was won in a record time of 2:20:60 by the filly Almond Eye on firm turf. Ridden by jockey Christophe Lemaire Almind Eye bested the previous track record set in 2005 by Alkaased of 2:22:10 by more than 1 1/2 seconds. Rounding out the top three finishers Pacesetter Kiseki placed second 1 3/4 lengths in back of the champion filly and Suave Richard finished third another 3 1/2 lengths in back of Pacesetter.

The 2020 Japan Cup was the biggest clash of champions in the race's history, with three Japan Triple Crown winners going head to head, two of them undefeated. The 2018 Japanese Fillies Triple Crown winner Almond Eye was the favorite, the undefeated 2020 Japanese Triple Crown winner Contrail was the second favorite, and the undefeated 2020 Japanese Fillies Triple Crown winner Daring Tact was the third favorite. Almond Eye won the race for a second time, with Contrail second and Daring Tact third. It gave Contrail and Daring Tact their first defeats but was a fitting final race of Almond Eye's racing career.

Winners 

 The 2002 race took place at Nakayama Racecourse over a distance of 2,200 metres.
Rose Kingdom finished 2nd to subsequent Japanese Horse of the Year Buena Vista but was promoted as a result of a disqualification.

Trivia 
The Japan Cup is one of the graded races in the horse simulation game Derby Owners Club.

See also 

Japan Cup Dirt

See also
 Horse racing in Japan
 List of Japanese flat horse races

References
Racing Post: 

External links 
Japan Cup Information
Japan Cup - Winners' list with placed horses 
 official result
Winners, in: Thoroughbred heritage

Horse races in Japan
Turf races in Japan
Open middle distance horse races